Two ships of the United States Navy have been named USS Chase. 

It was named after Reuben Chase.
It was named for Admiral Jehu V. Chase.

Other ships
 , a WWII 
 , a WWII , named for signer of the Declaration of Independence Samuel Chase

See also
 , a 
 , ships by the name, for the U.S. Coast Guard
 , two ships by the name, for the U.S. Revenue Cutter Service

Sources

 

United States Navy ship names